Hypopygus neblinae is a species of bluntnose knifefish from the family Hypopomidae. They live in freshwater and can grow up to 12.2 centimeters long. They are native to South America and are commonly called marble knifefish. They are occasionally sold as aquarium fish.

References

Hypopomidae
Fish of South America
Fish described in 1994
Taxa named by Francisco Mago Leccia